The 2019–20 Eerste Klasse season was a season of the Eerste Klasse.

Effects of the COVID-19 pandemic
On 12 March 2020, all football leagues were suspended until 31 March as the Dutch government forbade events due to the COVID-19 pandemic in the Netherlands. On 15 March this period was extended until 6 April. Due to the decision of the Dutch government to forbid all gatherings and events until 1 June 2020, this period was even further extended.

Eventually, on 31 March 2020, the KNVB decided not to resume competitions at the amateur level. They also decided, for those competitions involved, there would be no final standings, and therefore no champions, initially no promotions and no relegations. All teams will start next season at the same level as they did this season.

Following the cancellation, Meppeler Sport Club and Quick '20 gave up playing Sunday football to compete only on Saturdays and the KNVB promoted the four Hoofdklasse group leaders and two best runners-up to the Derde Divisie.  A total of six Eerste Klasse clubs were promoted to fill vacancies in the higher league.

Saturday sections 
Participating clubs were:

A: West I 
 Amsterdamsche FC
 Argon
 BOL
 Breukelen
 De Bilt
 HEDW
 Huizen
 Monnickendam
 Roda '46
 Scherpenzeel Promoted
 Woudenberg
 ZOB
 Zuidvogels
 Zwaluwen '30

B: West II 
 Brielle
 BVCB
 Die Haghe
 Forum Sport
 Heinenoord
 Honselersdijk
 Neptunus-Schiebroek
 Nootdorp
 Poortugaal Promoted
 RVVH
 SHO
 VELO
 Voorschoten '97
 XerxesDZB

C: South 
 Almkerk
 GRC '14
 Heerjansdam
 Kloetinge
 Leerdam
 Montfoort
 Nieuw-Lekkerland
 Nivo Sparta
 Oranje Wit
 Papendrecht
 Sliedrecht
 SVL
 Terneuzense Boys
 WNC

D: East 
 Bennekom
 CSV Apeldoorn
 DFS
 DOS '37
 DOS Kampen
 Ede
 DZC '68
 Kampen
 Hierden
 KHC
 Nunspeet
 Barneveld
 WHC
 SVZW

E: North 
 Balk
 Blauw Wit '34
 Broeksterwoude
 Drachten
 VV Groningen
 Leeuwarder Zwaluwen
 Noordscheschut Promoted
 Olde Veste
 Oranje Nassau
 Pelikaan-S
 PKC '83
 SVI
 Winsum
 Zeerobben

Sunday sections 
Participating clubs are:

A: West I 
 AFC '34
 AGB
 DSOV
 Fortuna Wormerveer
 Hoofddorp
 Kolping Boys
 Legmeervogels
 LSVV
 De Meern
 Papendorp
 SDZ
 Uitgeest
 Zaanlandia
 De Zouaven Promoted

B: West II 
 Boshuizen
 DHC
 DOSKO
 Den Hoorn
 Hillegersberg
 Olympia Gouda
 ROAC
 Rood Wit
 Spartaan '20
 TAC '90 Promoted
 TOGB Promoted
 Vlissingen
 VUC
 Zwervers

C: South I 
 Alverna
 Best
 Brabantia
 FC Eindhoven AV
 Erp
 HVCH
 Leones
 SC NEC
 Nemelaer
 Rhode
 SV TOP
 Unitas '30
 Woezik
 't Zand

D: South II 
 Chevremont
 Deurne
 Geldrop
 Heeze
 Limburgia
 SSS '18
 De Ster
 Venray
 Susteren
 Venlo
 Veritas
 Wilhelmina '08
 Wittenhorst
 ZSV

E: East 
 De Bataven
 Bemmel
 BVC '12
 Heino
 Orion
 Rigtersbleek
 RKHVV
 Raalte
 Stevo
 Tubantia
 TVC '28
 Voorwaarts Twello
 Winterswijk
 De Zweef

F: North 
 Dalfsen
 FVC
 GAVC
 Gomos
 GRC Groningen
 VV Heerenveen
 Hoogezand
 Noordster
 Roden
 Sneek Wit Zwart
 Stadspark
 SVBO
 VKW
 WVV 1896

References 

Eerste Klasse seasons
Eerste Klasse
Eerste Klasse